Thomas Grønnemark (born 12 December 1975) is a Danish former athlete who works as a throw-in coach for a number of professional football teams.

He held the Guinness World Record for the longest throw-in, and was a member of the Danish bobsled team for four years.
 
He has worked as a coach with teams, including Viborg, FC Midtjylland, Silkeborg, Horsens, Brentford and, as of September 2018, also works as a throw-in coach for Liverpool F.C.

References

1975 births
Living people
Danish sportspeople

Brentford F.C. non-playing staff
Liverpool F.C. non-playing staff